VisitDallas, formerly known as the Dallas Convention & Visitors Bureau, is a 501(c)(6) contracted by the City of Dallas to market Dallas as a convention and tourist destination. In January 2019, the Government of Dallas released an audit uncovering evidence of misuse of taxpayer funds, mismanagement, and excessive executive compensation. In November 2019, IRS Form 13909 was filed against VisitDallas calling for a public investigation by the Internal Revenue Service and Texas Attorney General.

Early controversies
In 2002, it was revealed the Dallas Convention & Visitors Bureau(DCVB), previous name of VisitDallas, was engaged in questionable spending such as spending money on expensive golf trips, paid excessive salaries, paying for expensive liquor tabs, using limos for travel to and from the airport, and going on regular trips to local strip clubs all paid for by the DCVB. These revelations led to David Whitney, President, of the DCVB resigning with a $308,000 severance package and Chris Luna, chairman of the bureau's board of directors, stepping down. In addition, the following actions were taken: 
 travel and entertainment expense policies were updated
 additional oversight policies and procedures created
 audit of the bureau’s expenses was launched

2019 City of Dallas audit
On January 4, 2019, the City of Dallas released an audit which demonstrated lax oversight, excessive executive compensation and spending, and its inability to properly track metrics for success after spending $150 million in taxpayer funds. The audit also highlighted how Phillip Jones, CEO, of VisitDallas didn't follow expense report policies having identified charges which included magazine subscriptions, valet service, and a $543 Tumi backpack. Reports submitted to the City demonstrating results from their efforts were deemed not reliable calling into question their effectiveness. The audit called into question whether the City would renew its contract which is due to expire on September 30, 2020 with many Council Members issuing calls to end it by then if not sooner.

Financial mismanagement
VisitDallas receives most of its revenue from hotel occupancy tax (HOT) and the Dallas Tourism Public Improvement District (DTPID), hotels in the city with 100 or more rooms averaging $30 million each year. The audit found it put all of its money into one bank account which is a direct violation of state law.

It was also found that annual payments made to the Convention Center were often late and taken from the Dallas Tourism Public Improvement District (DTPID). As a result, the audit states, “Late capital contributions hamper [the city’s] ability to plan and fund needed facility improvements for the Convention Center,”. It concludes, “Improperly using DTPID funds could result in legal liability and reputational damage for the city.”

In addition, the audit discovered VisitDallas “does not have adequate controls over certain expenses.” Many expense reports audited by the City found they did not include documentation, exceeded VisitDallas’ own policy limits, or violated state law. For example, VisitDallas has a spending cap of $180 per night but found Phillip Jones, CEO, of VisitDallas spent $17,069 on 18 hotel stays averaging $950 per night. It was also found CEO Phillip Jones spent $7,000 on gifts which were not documented in expense reports and that he had preference for using private car services instead of cheaper options like Uber or Lyft. In addition, the audit revealed Phillip Jones had access to a "long-term rental home" in Austin at a cost of $12,000 and a rental car. Since 2014, the CEO of VisitDallas paired overseas and domestic trips on behalf of the city with endurance racing contests in California, Quebec, Norway, England, and France claiming expenses were paid out of his own pocket although financial records cannot validate that claim.

Excessive executive compensation
Phillip Jones, CEO, of VisitDallas had an annual salary of $700,000 (an estimated $28,000 every two weeks) making him one of the highest paid tourism executives in the country. It was also discovered he received a $35,000 pay advance and had a balance due in the amount of $135,000. Speculation was made this amount was used to fund a trip to Hawaii. It was later found loans totaling $225,000 were made to Phillip Jones which were not documented on their IRS Form 990. According to state law, loans may be made by nonprofits to their executives only if they directly or indirectly benefit its mission. The exact statute reads, “POWER TO ASSIST EMPLOYEE OR OFFICER. (a) A corporation may lend money to or otherwise assist an employee or officer of the corporation, but not a director, if the loan or assistance may reasonably be expected to directly or indirectly benefit the corporation.” In a statement to The Texas Monitor, it was claimed these loans were for medical treatments for Phillip Jones's son.

Accusations of inflated salaries go beyond the CEO. It was found the number of employees making over $100,000 between 2016 and 2017, increased from 16 individuals to 30 even though membership fees, collected from local businesses in exchange for promotion, dropped 26%. Their 2017 IRS Form 990 included a 6% salary increase for CEO Phillip Jones and a $196,703 bonus, 11% increase for Matthew Jones, CFO, with a $128,042 bonus, and a 53% increase for Frank Librio, CMO.

The Internal Revenue Service is charged with enforcing the Federal Private Inurement Prohibition prohibiting a tax-exempt organization’s decision makers—board members, trustees, officers, or key employees—from receiving unreasonable benefits from the nonprofit’s income or assets. Excessive compensation paid to nonprofit executives is the most common violation of this prohibition leading to hefty fines on the persons involved. In addition, excessive executive compensation may result in the required return of the excessive amount and penalty taxes imposed on senior executives as well as the board members who approved it.

Unreliable reporting
The audit found reporting submitted demonstrating the results of efforts by VisitDallas to be unreliable. It was found no formal documentation for the methodology and formulas were used to prepare their monthly and yearly reports. In fact, the audit bluntly states, "VisitDallas' performance reports are not reliable." It was revealed VisitDallas spent approximately $150 million of hotel occupancy taxes and tourism district funds between 2013 and 2017 which it is not able to verify how or how well those dollars were spent.

The audit also found VisitDallas overstated "citywide" events, defined as an event that sells at least 2,500 room nights on "peak" event nights, with only 23 of the 53 events that VisitDallas claimed as qualified. In addition, the City had no way of verifying whether efforts by VisitDallas had an effect on increasing tourism.

The aftermath of the audit
After the release of the report, VisitDallas defended its action by stating policies were already in place addressing concerns found in the audit. On February 19, 2019, VisitDallas appeared before the Government Performance and Financial Management Committee of the Dallas City Council to respond to findings uncovered by the audit. Council Members Scott Griggs and Phillip Kingston motioned for the full council to ask the city manager to sever the contract with VisitDallas although it failed 3-2.

The auditor herself has directly answered questions about the audit. In response to accusations of commingling of City and State funds, interim auditor Carol Smith stated, "The report issued was shared with VisitDallas," Smith said in an interview, "and opportunities were provided for them to refute the report by providing additional facts. None were provided on that specific point."

Public outcry was generally divided into following categories:
 Continue with VisitDallas implementing only minor changes
 Fire Phillip Jones as CEO
 Terminate the contract with VisitDallas
 Issue a Request for Proposal
 Create a Local Government Corporation
 Absorb VisitDallas directly into the City of Dallas at the Kay Bailey Hutchison Convention Center

It was also uncovered senior executives attempted to influence the Dallas Mayoral race by using the political arm of the Texas Hotel & Lodging Association to donate $1,000 to Miguel Solis, Albert Black, Jason Villalba, Regina Montoya, and Mike Ablon to bolster opponents of Scott Griggs who was one of the most vocal critics of VisitDallas. It was discovered the Hotel PAC's largest contributor was Matthew Jones, who donated nearly $40,000 in 2017 and 2018.

Resignation of senior executives
Months after the release of the audit, Phillip Jones, CEO, resigned from VisitDallas followed by Matthew Jones, CFO. Sam Coats was named Interim CEO and the search for a permanent replacement was immediately started.

Phillip Jones, CEO
As a part of his severance agreement, Phillip Jones received a $600,000 severance package to be paid in 24 payments of $25,000 each. In a statement by VisitDallas Board Chairman, Mark Woelffer said Jones, "did no wrong, and the separation was mutual". He began working as Chief Destination Marketing Officer for the Royal Commission for Al-Ula in Saudi Arabia according to his LinkedIn profile.

Matthew Jones, CFO
At the time, the departure of Matthew Jones was portrayed as a resignation although it was later uncovered he was actually fired therefore not eligible to receive a severance package. In June, he opened a business consultancy along with his wife.

VisitDallas under interim CEO Sam Coats
On May 9, 2019, Sam Coats was announced as Interim CEO of VisitDallas. He is a former chair of DFW International Airport and has led multiple corporate turnarounds including Scholotzky's in the mid-2000s.

At a press conference, he indicated his top priorities would be:
 Finding a CFO
 Working with the board to find a new full-time CEO
 Getting VisitDallas’ contract with the city renewed

Before the press conference began, a group of three young black men in white shirts that read, “Make Dallas One City,” were asked by a VisitDallas employees to join them outside the room where a heated discussion with Frank Libra, CMO, of VisitDallas occurred afterwards leading to the discovery of a cease and desist letter which had been sent to one of the individuals, Bruce Carter, over the styling of “Dallas” in his logo.

Later that month, the Texas Attorney General ruled in a Freedom of Information Act (United States) that the City of Dallas did have to release all information regarding who on the Dallas City Council used a suite paid for by VisitDallas at the American Airlines Center mostly siding with Matthew Jones in citing it would put them at a competitive disadvantage. After some delay, the City of Dallas finally released the list of Council Members who used the suite at the American Airlines Center:
 Monica Alonzo (June 6, 2017 — Enrique Iglesias & Pitbull)
 Monica Alonzo (November 12, 2017—Latino Mix Live!)
 Casey Thomas (June 3, 2016 — R. Kelly)
 Casey Thomas (May 27, 2018 — Justin Timberlake)
 Casey Thomas (July 20, 2018 — Sam Smith)
 Casey Thomas (August 17, 2018 — WWW Big 3)
 Casey Thomas (October 14, 2018 — Bruno Mars)
 Casey Thomas (December 12, 2018 — Michelle Obama)

As a result of the release of this list, it was found that Dallas City Council Member Casey Thomas failed to disclose events he attended since 2016 using the VisitDallas suite at the American Airlines Center. The resulting aftermath led to an ethics complaint filed by retired Dallas lawyer Barry Jacobs alleging the passes from VisitDallas were part of an “ongoing pattern” in which Thomas expected the gifts to continue. In a rebuttal, VisitDallas stated the suite passes shouldn’t be considered gifts that needing to be reported on financial disclosure forms even though a panel of the city’s Ethics Advisory Commission disagreed allowing the complaint to move forward. This resulted in a 6 - 1 vote by the Ethics Advisory Commission ruling Dallas City Council Member Casey Thomas violated city code by failing to disclose these tickets but promised to recuse himself from any votes related to VisitDallas.

In September 2019, it was revealed VisitDallas was considering eliminating Board seats occupied by Dallas City Council Members which are appointed by Mayor Eric Johnson.

In October 2019, VisitDallas appeared at a public meeting with the Dallas City Council which at times proved to be highly contentious to discuss corrective actions taken since the release of the audit. It was uncovered by Dallas City Council Members that VisitDallas was promoting events in Frisco, Texas and Plano, Texas eliciting Dallas City Council Member Omar Narvaez to forcefully state, “VisitDallas wasn’t put in place to promote a region,” said West Dallas’ Omar Narvaez. “It was put in place to promote the city of Dallas. It’s time you realized who your boss is. Your boss is the city of Dallas.” Near the end of the meeting, Far North Dallas’ Dallas City Council Member Cara Mendelsohn recommended to city staff to begin preparations to find a new organization to market Dallas, either through a Request for Proposal process or by a limited government corporation similar to VisitHouston. To placate concerns held by Dallas City Council Members, Interim CEO Sam Coats revealed several sales executives were fired and the Board would be voting on reducing the number of Board Members from 55 to as few as 20.

In November 2019, the Dallas City Council approved an amended agreement with VisitDallas as it enters the final year of its contract with many Council Members publicly acknowledging they did so begrudgingly. The amended contract contained the following provisions:
 VisitDallas provide plans on how it plans to spend the city's money by March 30
 Provide to the Dallas City Council an annual report by December 30
 Hold an executive compensation and expense review on May 1
At this meeting, the Dallas City Council voted to redirect nearly $600,000 to arts promotion instead of VisitDallas.

A few days after the vote, it was revealed in a report by The Texas Monitor that:
 Several errors were uncovered on their Form 990 for fiscal year 2017 including the omission of a $275,000 annual payment to the American Airlines Center for a hospitality suite
 The figures from their Form 990 showing the number of six-figure employees almost doubling between 2016 and 2017 were incorrectly reported to the Internal Revenue Service
 VisitDallas also disagreed with its own reporting for its 2015 Form 990 showing the number of employees receiving a salary of $100,000 that year was 15 although it should have been 24

The future of VisitDallas
In November 2019, Internal Revenue Service Form 13909 was filed against VisitDallas and forwarded to the Texas Attorney General alleging misuse of taxpayer funds, mismanagement, and excessive executive compensation. This form is used by the Internal Revenue Service determine a violation of federal tax law. The Texas Attorney General will be seeking evidence of a diversion of charitable assets or gross mismanagement resulting in a significant financial loss or other substantial harm to the charity or the public interest.

In December 2019, it was announced Craig Davis was hired as the new permanent CEO of VisitDallas. He is currently CEO of VisitPITTSBURGH but also worked as an executive at hotels in Toronto, Chicago, and Pittsburgh. However, it has recently been revealed VisitPITTSBURGH had previously faced the same issues of lack of accountability and controversial executive pay packages as VisitDallas has encountered. Pennsylvania state Sen. Jim Ferlo said in a statement after the study was released, “This public agency has expended millions of dollars with high executive salaries, no accountability or oversight of its performance, and little to show by way of ensuring a financially solvent taxpayer-funded convention center”.

COVID-19
In March 2020, COVID-19 cases started to appear in north Texas leading to Dallas County, Texas officials declaring a local disaster resulting in a Shelter in place order by County Judge Clay Jenkins to combat the spread. This would have a direct impact on tourism and conventions in Dallas directly effecting Hotel Occupancy Tax (HOT) revenue which primarily funds VisitDallas.

In an April 2020 Memorandum, Assistant City Manager Joey Zapata warned Mayor Eric Johnson and the Dallas City Council of: 
 an estimated 41.7% loss, or $47.7M, from combined revenues due to 20 cancelled events to-date, including 5 large, citywide events and decreased hotel occupancy levels
 March forecasting losses of $7.2M from cancelled events at the Kay Bailey Hutchison Convention Center and $36.2M in HOT revenue and $4.3M in alcohol and beverage tax
 predicting a three to five-year economic recovery for hotels following the COVID-19 emergency orders

On May 20, 2020, VisitDallas went before the Dallas City Council to provide an update on their efforts nearly a year and half after the City's 2019 audit. During the briefing, VisitDallas CEO Craig Davis revealed they have:
 cut $2 million in programming
 decreased personnel costs by $2.5 million through eliminating 28 full-time and eight part-time positions and furloughed 13 — or about 45% of staff

In addition, it was revealed VisitDallas-related ethics complaints were filed in early March against:

 Council Member Adam McGough is alleged to have committed bribery under Texas Penal Code Chapter 36.08 regarding hockey tickets he agreed to accept from VisitDallas in December 2018 and has even being referred to the Public Integrity Unit within the Dallas Police Department
 Council Member Paula Blackmon is alleged to have a conflict of interest violation for representing both the City of Dallas and VisitDallas and a failure to file a conflict of interest form because of this
 Council Member Jennifer Gates is also alleged to have a conflict of interest violation for representing both the City of Dallas and VisitDallas and a failure to file a conflict of interest form because of this and violating her fiduciary duty with the City for approving former CEO Phillip Jones' controversial $600,000 severance package
 VisitDallas CEO Craig Davis is alleged to have violated Texas Penal Code Chapter 36.09 referencing a public offer in an article published by The Texas Monitor where he promised to give the Dallas City Council free tickets
 VisitDallas Public Affairs Director Gary Sanchez is alleged to have violated Texas Penal Code Chapter 36.09 for offering free hockey tickets to Council Member Adam McGough

References

1994 establishments in Texas
Dallas
Non-profit organizations based in Texas